Louise Goodman is a British reporter and presenter who worked on ITV's Formula One coverage until it ceased at the 2008 Brazilian Grand Prix. She now co-presents ITV's coverage of the British Touring Car Championship.  Her late partner was John Walton, a former Minardi team manager who died of a heart attack in 2004.

Biography
After growing up in Alresford, Hampshire, Goodman worked in marketing for the Jordan team before becoming one of the two pitlane reporters for ITV's Formula One coverage, initially alongside James Allen and later Ted Kravitz. Other than occasional pre-race segments by Beverley Turner, she was the only woman in the team. She was part of ITV's F1 team across the 12 years of the company's coverage. She missed the 2004 British Grand Prix due to her partner's death and was replaced for that race by Allan McNish.

In 2007 she became the presenter of ITV's coverage of the British Touring Car Championship alongside Ted Kravitz. In 2008 she joined HondaRacingF1.com as guest presenter for Formula One's first online TV channel.

In 2009, she rejoined ITV's coverage of the British Touring Car Championship alongside Steve Rider as reporter. Goodman provided cover for Channel 4's coverage of the 2017 British Grand Prix, for Lee McKenzie who was presenting coverage of the World Para Athletics championship. For the 2018 F1 season, Goodman stood in for McKenzie as reporter for certain races.

References

External links
Official website
Louise Goodman at itv.com
Fan club

Living people
English motorsport people
Formula One journalists and reporters
Motorsport announcers
People from Alresford
Year of birth missing (living people)